The enzyme urate oxidase (UO), uricase or factor-independent urate hydroxylase, absent in humans, catalyzes the oxidation of uric acid to 5-hydroxyisourate:

Uric acid + O2 + H2O → 5-hydroxyisourate + H2O2
5-hydroxyisourate + H2O →   allantoin + CO2

Structure 

Urate oxidase is mainly localised in the liver, where it forms a large electron-dense paracrystalline core in many peroxisomes. The enzyme exists as a tetramer of identical subunits, each containing a possible type 2 copper-binding site.

Urate oxidase is a homotetrameric enzyme containing four identical active sites situated at the interfaces between its four subunits. UO from A. flavus is made up of 301 residues and has a molecular weight of 33438 daltons. It is unique among the oxidases in that it does not require a metal atom or an organic co-factor for catalysis. Sequence analysis of several organisms has determined that there are 24 amino acids which are conserved, and of these, 15 are involved with the active site.

Reaction mechanism 
Urate oxidase is the first enzyme in a pathway of three enzymes to convert uric acid to S-(+)-allantoin. After uric acid is converted to 5-hydroxyisourate by urate oxidase, 5-hydroxyisourate (HIU) is converted to 2-oxo-4-hydroxy-4-carboxy-5-ureidoimidazoline (OHCU) by HIU hydrolase, and then to S-(+)-allantoin by 2-oxo-4-hydroxy-4-carboxy-5-ureidoimidazoline decarboxylase (OHCU decarboxylase). Without HIU hydrolase and OHCU decarboxylase, HIU will spontaneously decompose into racemic allantoin.

The active site binds uric acid (and its analogues), allowing it to ineract with O2. According to X-ray crystallography, it is the conjugate base of uric acid that binds and is then deprotonated to a dianion. The dianion is stabilized by extensive hydrogen-bonding, e.g., to  Arg 176 and Gln 228 . Oxygen accepts two electrons from the urate dianion, via a sequence of one-electron transfers, ultimately yielding hydrogen peroxide and the dehydrogenated substrate. The dehydrourate adds water (hydrates) to produce 5-hydroxyisourate.

Urate oxidase is known to be inhibited by both cyanide and chloride ions. Inhibition involvesf anion-π interactions between the inhibitor and the uric acid substrate.

Significance of absence in humans
Urate oxidase is found in nearly all organisms, from bacteria to mammals, but is inactive in humans and several other great apes, having been lost in primate evolution.  This means that instead of producing allantoin as the end product of purine oxidation, the pathway ends with uric acid. This leads to humans having much higher and more highly variable levels of urate in the blood than most other mammals.

Genetically, the loss of urate oxidase function in humans was caused by two nonsense mutations at codons 33 and 187 and an aberrant splice site.

It has been proposed that the loss of urate oxidase gene expression has been advantageous to hominids, since uric acid is a powerful antioxidant and scavenger of singlet oxygen and radicals.  Its presence provides the body with protection from oxidative damage, thus prolonging life and decreasing age-specific cancer rates.

However, uric acid plays a complex physiological role in several processes, including inflammation and danger signalling, and modern purine-rich diets can lead to hyperuricaemia, which is linked to many diseases including an increased risk of developing gout.

Disease relevance 
 
Urate oxidase is formulated as a protein drug (rasburicase) for the treatment of acute hyperuricemia in patients receiving chemotherapy.  A PEGylated form of urate oxidase, pegloticase, was FDA approved in 2010 for the treatment of chronic gout in adult patients refractory to "conventional therapy".

Children with non-Hodgkin's lymphoma (NHL), specifically with Burkitt's lymphoma and B-cell acute lymphoblastic leukemia (B-ALL), often experience tumor lysis syndrome (TLS), which occurs when breakdown of tumor cells by chemotherapy releases uric acid and cause the formation of uric acid crystals in the renal tubules and collecting ducts. This can lead to kidney failure and even death. Studies suggest that patients at a high risk of developing TLS may benefit from the administration of urate oxidase. However, humans lack the subsequent enzyme HIU hydroxylase in the pathway to degrade uric acid to allantoin, so long-term urate oxidase therapy could potentially have harmful effects because of toxic effects of HIU.

Higher uric acid levels have also been associated with epilepsy. However, it was found in mouse models that disrupting urate oxidase actually decreases brain excitability and susceptibility to seizures.

Graft-versus-host disease (GVHD) is often a side effect of allogeneic hematopoietic stem cell transplantation (HSCT), driven by donor T cells destroying host tissue. Uric acid has been shown to increase T cell response, so clinical trials have shown that urate oxidase can be administered to decrease uric acid levels in the patient and subsequently decrease the likelihood of GVHD.

In legumes
UO is also an essential enzyme in the ureide pathway, where nitrogen fixation occurs in the root nodules of legumes. The fixed nitrogen is converted to metabolites that are transported from the roots throughout the plant to provide the needed nitrogen for amino acid biosynthesis.

In legumes, 2 forms of uricase are found: in the roots, the tetrameric form; and, in the uninfected cells of root nodules, a monomeric form, which plays an important role in nitrogen-fixation.

See also 
2-oxo-4-hydroxy-4-carboxy-5-ureidoimidazoline decarboxylase

References 

EC 1.7.3